Carl Gustaf Creutz (1660−1728) was a Swedish general.

He served as a page of Charles XI and experienced the Scanian War and by 1691 he was a captain in the Life Regiment of Horse. The Great Northern War began in 1700 and Creutz participated in the Landing on Humlebæk. He distinguished himself at the battles of Petschora and Kletsh. Promotions to major and lieutenant colonel then came quickly. Creutz became a colonel in 1704. The Battle of Poltava in 1709 brought Creutz command of the entire cavalry. However, he had to surrender soon after Perevolotnya. After Count Piper's death, he was the senior Swedish prisoner in Russia, of which his extant correspondence bears visible witness. In 1722, he was able to return to Sweden and service in the cavalry. He was named a general that year.

References
"Carl Gustav Creutz" Svensk biograpfiskt lexikon. Retrieved December 13, 2021.

Swedish Army generals
Swedish military personnel of the Great Northern War
Swedish prisoners of war
Caroleans
1660 births
1728 deaths
Prisoners of war held by Russia
Carl Gustaf